Ofu Airport  is a public airport located one mile (2 km) southeast of the village of Ofu on the island of Ofu in American Samoa, an unincorporated territory of the United States. This airport is publicly owned by Government of American Samoa.

The Ofu runway was driven as part of the Google Street View project; users looking at Street View imagery at this location will get a view from the runway as opposed to the road which was apparently under construction when the photos were taken.

History
Originally constructed in 1974, the airport runway was moved to its current location in 1986.

Facilities and aircraft 

For 12-month period ending December 30, 2004, the airport had 1,944 aircraft operations, an average of 5 per day, 100% of which were air taxi flights.

Airlines and destinations

References

External links 
 National Park Service map of the Manu‘a Islands showing location of Ofu village and airport on the island of Ofu.
 Resources for this airport:
 
 

Airports in American Samoa